Jean-Michel Ménard (born January 19, 1976) is a curler from Aylmer, Quebec, Canada. Ménard is notable for being the first Francophone born skip from Quebec to win the Brier - Canada's national curling championship- which he did in 2006. In 2022 he won the World Mixed Curling Championship.

Career
While living in Aylmer, Quebec and playing in leagues at the Ottawa Curling Club and the Rideau Curling Club, Ménard also represents the Club de Curling Etchemin in Saint-Romuald, Quebec along with his team of Martin Crête, Éric Sylvain and brother Philippe Ménard.

Ménard had a 5-7 record at the 1996 Canadian Junior Curling Championships, and would return to a national championships at the 2000 Canadian Mixed Curling Championship. He would return to the mixed in 2001, winning the tournament. Ménard found himself on the team of Guy Hemmings as his second in 2003, which they won the Quebec championships sending them to the 2003 Nokia Brier. At the Brier, they finished 6-5, just out of the playoffs.

Ménard would return to the Brier at the 2005 Tim Hortons Brier, this time as a skip where he finished the round-robin with a 7-4 record sending him to the playoffs. However, he lost in the 3-4 game to Nova Scotia's Shawn Adams.

Ménard returned once again to the Brier in 2006. His team finished the round robin in second place and an 8-3 record. In the playoffs they lost the 1-2 game, but went on to win the semi-final against Team Nova Scotia skipped by Mark Dacey in a lacklustre game. In the final, against Ontario's Glenn Howard team, Ménard and his Quebec foursome played a much better game, claiming victory- the first ever for a full Francophone born team and the second ever for a Quebec team.

Ménard's victory at the Brier qualified him for the 2006 World Men's Curling Championship in Lowell, Massachusetts. At the Worlds, Ménard's team went all the way to the finals, but lost to Team Scotland (skipped by David Murdoch) in the final.

In 2007, Ménard lost the provincial championship to Pierre Charette, ending his bid to repeat as defending Brier champions. In 2008, Ménard returned to the Brier, where he finished with a disappointing 4-7 record. He returned again in 2009 where he finished with a 7-4 record, but lost to Manitoba's Jeff Stoughton in a tie-breaker. Ménard failed to qualify for the 2010 Brier, losing out in the semi-final of the 2010 Quebec Men's Provincial Curling Championship to Martin Ferland. He missed out on the Brier again in 2011, losing in the 2011 Quebec Men's Provincial Curling Championship  final to François Gagné. Ménard missed out on the Brier for the third straight year when he lost in the semi-final of the 2012 Quebec Men's Provincial Curling Championship to Robert Desjardins. Ménard finally returned to the Brier when he won the 2013 Quebec Men's Provincial Curling Championship. At the 2013 Tim Hortons Brier, he had an average week, finishing the event with a 6-5 record. Ménard won another provincial title in 2014, sending his rink to the 2014 Tim Hortons Brier. He led his team to a strong 4th-place performance, losing to Manitoba's Jeff Stoughton in the bronze medal game.

Ménard won the 2015 Quebec Men's Provincial Curling Championship, but had less success at the 2015 Tim Hortons Brier, going 6–5. He won another Quebec championship in 2016, and led Quebec to a 4–7 record at the 2016 Tim Hortons Brier. He won a final Quebec championship in in 2017, and led his province to a 7–4 record at the 2017 Tim Hortons Brier.

Ménard stepped away from competitive curling in 2017, but returned in 2021 to win his second Canadian Mixed Championship, with teammates Marie-France Larouche, Ian Belleau and wife Annie Lemay. In 2022 he won the World Mixed Curling Championship for Canada, defeating host Scotland 7-4 in Aberdeen, Scotland.

Personal life
Ménard is married to eight-time (as of 2016) provincial women's curling champion Annie Lemay, and they have two children. He works as a human resources manager for the Government of Canada.

See also
List of curlers

References

External links
 Official website of Team Menard
 

1976 births
Brier champions
Curlers from Quebec
French Quebecers
Living people
People from Amos, Quebec
Sportspeople from Gatineau
Canadian male curlers
World mixed curling champions
Canadian mixed curling champions
Continental Cup of Curling participants
Canada Cup (curling) participants